Hasan Nezam (also Romanized as Ḩasan Neẓām; also known as Ḩasanneẓām) is a village in Angali Rural District, in the Central District of Bushehr County, Bushehr Province, Iran. At the 2006 census, its population was 31, in 9 families.

References 

Populated places in Bushehr County